Lisle Township is one of nine townships in DuPage County, Illinois, USA.  As of the 2010 census, its population was 116,268 and it contained 47,174 housing units.

Geography

Cities, towns, villages
 Bolingbrook (partial)
 Downers Grove (partial)
 Lisle (vast majority)
 Naperville (partial)
 Woodridge (partial)

Unincorporated towns
 Belmont at 
(This list is based on USGS data and may include former settlements.)

Adjoining Townships
 York Township, DuPage County (northeast)
 Downers Grove Township, DuPage County (east and southeast)
 DuPage Township, Will County (south)
 Wheatland Township, Will County (southwest)
 Naperville Township, DuPage County (west)
 Winfield Township, DuPage County (northwest)
 Milton Township, DuPage County (north)

Cemeteries
The township contains these five cemeteries: Blodgett, Illinois Benedictine College, Oak Crest, Saint Bernards and Saints Peter and Paul.

Major highways
  Interstate 88
  Interstate 355
  U.S. Route 34
  Illinois Route 53

Airports and landing strips
 Corporetum Office Campus Heliport
 Global Fire Protection Heliport

Landmarks
 Benedictine University
 Dupage County Green Valley Forest Preserve
 Morton Arboretum (south half)

Demographics

School districts
 Lisle Community Unit School District 202
 Naperville Community Unit District 203

Political districts
 Illinois's 6th congressional district
 Illinois's 11th congressional district
 State House District 42
 State House District 47
 State House District 48
 State Senate District 21
 State Senate District 24

References
 
 United States Census Bureau 2008 TIGER/Line Shapefiles
 United States National Atlas

External links
 City-Data.com
 Illinois State Archives
 Township Officials of Illinois

Townships in DuPage County, Illinois
Populated places established in 1849
1849 establishments in Illinois
Townships in Illinois